Ognyovka (Sooru) is a rural locality (a selo) and the administrative centre of Ognyovskoye Rural Settlement, Ust-Koksinsky District, the Altai Republic, Russia. The population was 634 as of 2016. There are 11 streets.

Geography 
Ognyovka is located 10 km southwest of Ust-Koksa (the district's administrative centre) by road. Beryozovka is the nearest rural locality.

References 

Rural localities in Ust-Koksinsky District